Selangor Young People Secretariat or in  (SERANG) which is a Non-government organization (NGO) that fight for the issues of young people in Selangor. and to monitor the administration of the state of Selangor which is led by the Pakatan Rakyat (PR) and its successor Pakatan Harapan (PH). They usually organize carnivals, stage performance and poem recitation in order to attract more young people to their cause. SERANG incumbent chairman is Budiman Mohd Zohdi who was the Selangor state legislative assemblyman (MLA) for the Sungai Panjang constituency  (2013-2018) and was also the Member of Parliament (MP) for the Sungai Besar constituency (2016-2018) from United Malays National Organisation (UMNO) the main party of Barisan Nasional (BN) coalition.
	
Some of the issues brought forward by Budiman and his comrades are the free education promised by the state government.

References

External links 
 SERANG Facebook Page

2012 establishments in Malaysia
Non-profit organisations based in Malaysia
Youth organisations based in Malaysia
Political organisations based in Malaysia
Political advocacy groups in Malaysia
Whistleblowing in Malaysia
Whistleblower support organizations